Being or Not Being is a 2015 Mexican drama film, directed by Marcelo González. The film stars Flavio Medina and Aislinn Derbez and was filmed in Tlacotalpan, Veracruz and Xalapa in the Mexican state of Veracruz. In the film, Augusto (Medina) is a forty-six years old single man who relocates to another city following his mother's passing. He meets Nástenska (Derbez) and falls in love with her. The film is González first feature film and received six nominations for the 2017 Diosas de Plata awards winning for Best Supporting Actress (Tiaré Scanda) and Best Cinematography (Jerónimo Rodríguez García).

Plot
Augusto (Flavio Medina) is a forty-six year-old single man who decided to move from his hometown Xalapa to Tlacotalpan after his mother's death. He rents a room in a pension and meets a neighbor named Ludivina (Tiaré Scanda) who becomes his friend. When he is alone in the room, his mother's ghost (Patricia Reyes Spíndola) appears on his mirror and continually scolds him.

He meets Nástenska (Aislinn Derbez), a waitress in a local restaurant run by her godmother (Angélica Aragón), and becomes infatuated with her. They become friends and she invites him to watch her playing Roxanne in the play Cyrano of Bergerac at a local theater in Veracruz; the same night she celebrates her birthday and after a dinner party, they walk on a beach and end up making love.

The following day, Mauricio (Gonzalo García Vivanco), Nástenska's boyfriend, returns to the city after spending one year on a boat and she decides to elope with him. Augusto falls into depression after her departure and Ludivina takes advantage to comfort him and they have sex. The morning after Augusto tells Ludivina that he can not marry her, and she responds that she does not want to marry and reveals her past as a prostitute.

A few months later Nástenska returns to Tlacotalpan and finds Augusto working at the restaurant where she used to work and he discovers that she is pregnant, they have a conversation and she confirms her return to Spain with Mauricio despite not having the happy life she always wanted. Ludivina goes away for the weekend and upon returning she discovers Augusto's dead body in his room; Augusto died from eating expired canned food. Augusto's ghost is seen happy while his ashes are poured into the sea by Nástenska.

Cast
Flavio Medina as Augusto
Aislinn Derbez as Nástenska
Tiaré Scanda as Ludivina
Angélica Aragón as Matrushka
Patricia Reyes Spíndola as Verónica
Gonzalo García Vivanco as Mauricio
Ruben González Garza as Don Manuel
José Antonio Barón as Don Memo
Iliana de la Garza as Margarita
Horacio Castelo as Cyrano de Bergerac
Imelda Castro as Lola
Luis Monterrubio as Jorge
Mary Paz Mata as Nana

Awards and nominations

Diosas de Plata
The Diosas de Platas ("Silver Goddesses") are awarded annually by the Film Mexican Journalists Association (Asociación de Periodistas Cinematográficos de México) (PECIME). Estar o No Estar received six nominations.

|-
|rowspan="6" scope="row"| 2017
|scope="row"| Marcelo González
|rowspan="1" scope="row"| Best First Feature Film
| 
|-
|scope="row"| Flavio Medina
|rowspan="" scope="row"| Best Actor
| 
|-
|scope="row"| Aislinn Derbez
|rowspan="" scope="row"| Best Actress
| 
|-
|scope="row"| Tiaré Scanda
|rowspan="1" scope="row"| Best Supporting Actress
| 
|-
|scope="row"| Patricia Reyes Spíndola
|rowspan="1" scope="row"| Best Actress in a Minor Role
| 
|-
|scope="row"| Jeronimo Rodriguez Garcia
|rowspan="1" scope="row"| Best Cinematography
| 
|-

External links

References

2015 films
2015 drama films
Mexican drama films
2010s Spanish-language films
2010s Mexican films